Paisley Galaxy is the eighth Cantonese studio album by Hong Kong singer Kelly Chen. It was released on May 26, 2000, through Go East Entertainment Company Ltd in Hong Kong.

Track listing

CD

References

Kelly Chen albums
2000 albums